Ophiusa tirhacoides is a moth of the family Erebidae. It is endemic to Borneo.

The wingspan is 25–26 mm.

Larvae have been reared on Casuarina.

External links
Species info

Ophiusa